The Mars Orbiter Mission (MOM), also called Mangalyaan, was a space probe orbiting Mars since 24 September 2014. It was launched on 5 November 2013 by the Indian Space Research Organisation (ISRO). It was India's first interplanetary mission and it made ISRO the fourth space agency to achieve Mars orbit, after Roscosmos, NASA, and the European Space Agency. It made India the first Asian nation to reach the Martian orbit and the first nation in the world to do so on its maiden attempt.

The Mars Orbiter Mission probe lifted-off from the First Launch Pad at Satish Dhawan Space Centre (Sriharikota Range SHAR), Andhra Pradesh, using a Polar Satellite Launch Vehicle (PSLV) rocket C25 at 09:08 UTC on 5 November 2013. The launch window was approximately 20 days long and started on 28 October 2013. The MOM probe spent about a month in Earth orbit, where it made a series of seven apogee-raising orbital manoeuvres before trans-Mars injection on 30 November 2013 (UTC). After a 298-day transit to Mars, it was put into Mars orbit on 24 September 2014.

The mission was a "technology demonstrator" project to develop the technologies for designing, planning, management, and operations of an interplanetary mission. It carried five scientific instruments. The spacecraft was monitored from the Spacecraft Control Centre at ISRO Telemetry, Tracking and Command Network (ISTRAC) in Bengaluru with support from the Indian Deep Space Network (IDSN) antennae at Bengaluru, Karnataka.

On 2 October 2022, it was reported that the orbiter had irrecoverably lost communications with Earth after entering a seven-hour eclipse period in April 2022 that it was not designed to survive. The following day, ISRO released a statement that all attempts to revive Mangalyaan had failed and officially declared it dead, citing the loss of fuel and battery power to the probe's instruments.

History

On 23 November 2008, the first public acknowledgement of an uncrewed mission to Mars was announced by then-ISRO chairman G. Madhavan Nair. The MOM mission concept began with a feasibility study in 2010 by the Indian Institute of Space Science and Technology after the launch of lunar satellite Chandrayaan-1 in 2008. Prime Minister Manmohan Singh approved the project on 3 August 2012, after the Indian Space Research Organisation completed  of required studies for the orbiter. The satellite costs  and the rest of the budget has been attributed to ground stations and relay upgrades that will be used for other ISRO projects.

The space agency had planned the launch on 28 October 2013 but was postponed to 5 November following the delay in ISRO's spacecraft tracking ships to take up pre-determined positions due to poor weather in the Pacific Ocean. Launch opportunities for a fuel-saving Hohmann transfer orbit occur every 26 months, in this case the next two would be in 2016 and 2018.

Assembly of the PSLV-XL launch vehicle, designated C25, started on 5 August 2013. The mounting of the five scientific instruments was completed at Indian Space Research Organisation Satellite Centre, Bengaluru, and the finished spacecraft was shipped to Sriharikota on 2 October 2013 for integration to the PSLV-XL launch vehicle. The satellite's development was fast-tracked and completed in a record 15 months, partly due to using reconfigured Chandrayaan-2 orbiter bus. Despite the US federal government shutdown, NASA reaffirmed on 5 October 2013 it would provide communications and navigation support to the mission "with their Deep Space Network facilities.". During a meeting on 30 September 2014, NASA and ISRO officials signed an agreement to establish a pathway for future joint missions to explore Mars. One of the working group's objectives will be to explore potential coordinated observations and science analysis between the MAVEN orbiter and MOM, as well as other current and future Mars missions.

On 2 October 2022, it was reported that the orbiter had irrecoverably lost communications with Earth after entering long eclipse period in April 2022 that it was not designed to survive. At the time of communications loss it was unknown whether the probe had lost power or inadvertently realigned its Earth-facing antenna during automatic maneuvers.

Team
Some of the scientists and engineers involved in the mission include:
K. Radhakrishnan led as Chairman ISRO.
Mylswamy Annadurai was the Programme Director and in charge of budget management as well as direction for spacecraft configuration, schedule and resources. 
S Ramakrishnan was a Director who helped in developing the liquid propulsion system of the PSLV launcher. 
P. Kunhikrishnan was a Project Director in the PSLV programme. He was also a Mission director of PSLV-C25/Mars Orbiter Mission. 
Moumita Dutta was the Project manager of the Mars Orbiter Mission.
Nandini Harinath was the Deputy Operations Director of Navigation.
Ritu Karidhal was the Deputy Operations Director of Navigation.
BS Kiran was the Associate Project Director of Flight Dynamics.
V Kesava Raju was the Mars Orbiter Mission Director.
V Koteswara Rao was ISRO scientific secretary.
Chandradathan was the Director of the Liquid Propulsion System.
A. S. Kiran Kumar was the Director of the Satellite Application Centre.
M. Y. S. Prasad is the Director at Satish Dhawan Space Centre. He was also the chairman at Launch Authorisation Board.
S. K. Shivakumar was a Director at the ISRO Satellite Centre. He was also a Project Director for the Deep Space Network.
Subbiah Arunan was a Project Director at Mars Orbiter Mission.
B Jayakumar was an Associate Project Director at the PSLV programme who was responsible for testing the rocket systems.
MS Pannirselvam was the Chief General Manager at the Sriharikota Rocket port and was tasked to maintain launch schedules.

Cost
The total cost of the mission was approximately 450 Crore, making it the least-expensive Mars mission to date. The low cost of the mission was ascribed by ISRO chairman K. Radhakrishnan to various factors, including a "modular approach", few ground tests and long working days (18 to 20 hours) for scientists. BBC's Jonathan Amos specified lower worker costs, home-grown technologies, simpler design, and a significantly less complicated payload than NASA's MAVEN.

Mission objectives

The primary objective of the mission is to develop the technologies required for designing, planning, management and operations of an interplanetary mission. The secondary objective is to explore Mars' surface features, morphology, mineralogy and Martian atmosphere using indigenous scientific instruments.

The main objectives are to develop the technologies required for designing, planning, management and operations of an interplanetary mission comprising the following major tasks:

 Orbit manoeuvres to transfer the spacecraft from Earth-centred orbit to heliocentric trajectory and finally, capture into Martian orbit
 Development of force models and algorithms for orbit and attitude (orientation)  computations and analysis
 Navigation in all phases
 Maintain the spacecraft in all phases of the mission
 Meeting power, communications, thermal and payload operation requirements
 Incorporate autonomous features to handle contingency situations

Scientific objectives
The scientific objectives deal with the following major aspects:

 Exploration of Mars surface features by studying the morphology, topography and mineralogy
 Study the constituents of Martian atmosphere including methane and  using remote sensing techniques
 Study the dynamics of the upper atmosphere of Mars, effects of solar wind and radiation and the escape of volatiles to outer space

The mission would also provide multiple opportunities to observe the Martian moon Phobos and also offer an opportunity to identify and re-estimate the orbits of asteroids seen during the Martian Transfer Trajectory.

Studies 
In May–June 2015 Indian scientists got an opportunity to study the Solar Corona during the Mars conjunction when earth and Mars are on the opposite sides of the sun. During this period the S band waves emitted by Mangalyaan were transmitted through the Solar Corona that extends millions of kms into space. This event helped scientists study the Solar surface and regions where temperature changed abruptly.

Spacecraft design
Bus: The spacecraft's bus is a modified I-1 K structure and propulsion hardware configuration, similar to Chandrayaan-1, India's lunar orbiter that operated from 2008 to 2009, with specific improvements and upgrades needed for a Mars mission. The satellite structure is constructed of an aluminium and composite fibre reinforced plastic (CFRP) sandwich construction.
Power: Electric power is generated by three solar array panels of  each ( total), for a maximum of 840 watts of power generation in Mars orbit. Electricity is stored in a 36 Ah Lithium-ion battery.
The orbiter also has eight  thrusters for attitude control (orientation).
Attitude and Orbit Control System: Maneuvering system that includes electronics with a MAR31750 processor, two star sensors, a solar panel Sun sensor, a coarse analog Sun sensor, four reaction wheels, and the primary propulsion system.
Antennae: Low gain antenna, mid gain antenna, and high gain antenna

Scientific instruments

The  scientific payload consists of five instruments:

Atmospheric studies:
 Lyman-Alpha Photometer (LAP) – a photometer that measures the relative abundance of deuterium and hydrogen from Lyman-alpha emissions in the upper atmosphere. Measuring the deuterium/hydrogen ratio will allow an estimation of the amount of water loss to outer space. The nominal plan to operate LAP is between the ranges of approximately  before and after Mars periapsis. Minimum observation duration for achieving LAP's science goals is 60 minutes per orbit during normal range of operation. The objectives of this instrument are as follows:
Estimation of D/H ratio
Estimation of escape flux of H2 corona
Generation of hydrogen and deuterium coronal profiles.
 Methane Sensor for Mars (MSM) – was meant to measure methane in the atmosphere of Mars, if any, and map its sources with an accuracy of few 10s parts-per-billion (ppb). After entering Mars orbit it was determined that the instrument, although in good working condition, had a design flaw and it was incapable of distinguishing methane on Mars. The instrument can accurately map Mars albedo at 1.65um.
 MSM Design Flaw. The MSM sensor was expected to measure methane in the Mars atmosphere; methane on Earth is often associated with life. However,  after it entered orbit, it was reported that there was an issue with how it collected and processed data. The spectrometer could measure intensity of different spectral bands, [such as methane] but instead of sending back the spectra, it sent back the sum of the sampled spectra and also the gaps between the sampled lines. The difference was supposed to be the methane signal, but since other spectra such as carbon dioxide could have varying intensities, it was not possible to determine the actual methane intensity. The device was repurposed as an albedo mapper.

Particle environment studies:
 Mars Exospheric Neutral Composition Analyser (MENCA) – is a quadrupole mass analyser capable of analysing the neutral composition of particles in the range of 1–300 amu (atomic mass unit) with unit mass resolution. The heritage of this payload is from Chandra's Altitudinal Composition Explorer (CHACE) payload aboard the Moon Impact Probe (MIP) in Chandrayaan-1 mission. MENCA is planned to perform five observations per orbit with one hour per observation.
Surface imaging studies:
 Thermal Infrared Imaging Spectrometer (TIS) – TIS measures the thermal emission and can be operated during both day and night. It would map surface composition and mineralogy of Mars and also monitor atmospheric  and turbidity (required for the correction of MSM data). Temperature and emissivity are the two basic physical parameters estimated from thermal emission measurement. Many minerals and soil types have characteristic spectra in TIR region. TIS can map surface composition and mineralogy of Mars.
 Mars Colour Camera (MCC) – This tricolour camera gives images and information about the surface features and composition of Martian surface. It is useful to monitor the dynamic events and weather of Mars like dust storms/atmospheric turbidity. MCC will also be used for probing the two satellites of Mars, Phobos and Deimos. MCC would provide context information for other science payloads. MCC images are to be acquired whenever MSM and TIS data is acquired.

Telemetry and command

The  dish antenna was used for communication with the craft until April 2014, after which the larger  antenna was used. NASA's Deep Space Network is providing position data through its three stations located in Canberra, Madrid and Goldstone on the US West Coast during the non-visible period of ISRO's network. The South African National Space Agency's (SANSA) Hartebeesthoek (HBK) ground station is also providing satellite tracking, telemetry and command services.

Communications
Communications are handled by two 230-watt TWTAs and two coherent transponders. The antenna array consists of a low-gain antenna, a medium-gain antenna and a high-gain antenna. The high-gain antenna system is based on a single  reflector illuminated by a feed at S-band. It is used to transmit and receive the telemetry, tracking, commanding and data to and from the Indian Deep Space Network.

Mission profile

Launch

ISRO originally intended to launch MOM with its Geosynchronous Satellite Launch Vehicle (GSLV), but the GSLV failed twice in 2010 and still had issues with its cryogenic engine. Waiting for the new batch of rockets would have delayed the MOM for at least three years, so ISRO opted to switch to the less-powerful Polar Satellite Launch Vehicle (PSLV). Since it was not powerful enough to place MOM on a direct-to-Mars trajectory, the spacecraft was launched into a highly elliptical Earth orbit and used its own thrusters over multiple perigee burns (to take advantage of the Oberth effect) to place itself on a trans-Mars trajectory.

On 19 October 2013, ISRO chairman K. Radhakrishnan announced that the launch had to be postponed by a week for 5 November 2013 due to a delay of a crucial telemetry ship reaching Fiji. During the first three orbit raising operations, ISRO progressively tested the spacecraft systems.

Its main engine, a derivative of the system used on India's communications satellites, uses the bipropellant combination monomethylhydrazine and dinitrogen tetroxide to achieve the thrust necessary for escape velocity from Earth. It was also used to slow down the probe for Mars orbit insertion and, subsequently, for orbit corrections.

Models used for MOM:

Orbit raising manoeuvres

Several orbit raising operations were conducted from the Spacecraft Control Centre (SCC) at the ISRO Telemetry, Tracking and Command Network (ISTRAC) at Peenya, Bengaluru on 6, 7, 8, 10, 12 and 16 November by using the spacecraft's on-board propulsion system and a series of perigee burns. The first three of the five planned orbit raising manoeuvres were completed with nominal results, while the fourth was only partially successful. However, a subsequent supplementary manoeuvre raised the orbit to the intended altitude aimed for in the original fourth manoeuvre. A total of six burns were completed while the spacecraft remained in Earth orbit, with a seventh burn conducted on 30 November to insert MOM into a heliocentric orbit for its transit to Mars.

The first orbit-raising manoeuvre was performed on 6 November 2013 at 19:47 UTC when the spacecraft's  liquid engine was fired for 416 seconds.

Because of this, the apogee was boosted to  instead of the planned . When testing the redundancies built-in for the propulsion system, the flow to the liquid engine stopped, with consequent reduction in incremental velocity. During the fourth orbit burn, the primary and redundant coils of the solenoid flow control valve of 440 newton liquid engine and logic for thrust augmentation by the attitude control thrusters were being tested. When both primary and redundant coils were energised together during the planned modes, the flow to the liquid engine stopped. Operating both the coils simultaneously is not possible for future operations, however they could be operated independently of each other, in sequence.

Trans-Mars injection

On 30 November 2013 at 19:19 UTC, a 23-minute engine firing initiated the transfer of MOM away from Earth orbit and on heliocentric orbit toward Mars.

Trajectory correction maneuvers 
Four trajectory corrections were originally planned, but only three were carried out. The first trajectory correction manoeuvre (TCM) was carried out on 11 December 2013 at 01:00 UTC by firing the  thrusters for a duration of 40.5 seconds. After this event, MOM was following the designed trajectory so closely that the trajectory correction manoeuvre planned in April 2014 was not required. The second trajectory correction manoeuvre was performed on 11 June 2014 at 11:00 UTC by firing the spacecraft's 22 newton thrusters for 16 seconds. The third planned trajectory correction manoeuvre was postponed, due to the orbiter's trajectory closely matching the planned trajectory. The third trajectory correction was also a deceleration test 3.9 seconds long on 22 September 2014.

Mars orbit insertion

The plan was for an insertion into Mars orbit on 24 September 2014, approximately 2 days after the arrival of NASA's MAVEN orbiter. The 440-newton liquid apogee motor was test fired on 22 September at 09:00 UTC for 3.968 seconds, about 41 hours before actual orbit insertion.

After these events, the spacecraft performed a reverse manoeuvre to reorient from its deceleration burn and entered Martian orbit.

Status

On 28 September 2014, MOM controllers published the spacecraft's first global view of Mars. The image was captured by the Mars Colour Camera (MCC).

On 7 October 2014, the ISRO altered MOM's orbit so as to move it behind Mars for Comet Siding Spring's flyby of the planet on 19 October 2014. The spacecraft consumed  of fuel for the manoeuvre. After the comet passed by Mars, ISRO reported that MOM remained healthy.

On 4 March 2015, the ISRO reported that the MSM instrument was functioning normally and are studying Mars' albedo, the reflectivity of the planet's surface. The Mars Colour Camera was also returning new images of the Martian surface.

On 24 March 2015, MOM completed its initial six-month mission in orbit around Mars. ISRO extended the mission by an additional six months; the spacecraft has  of propellant remaining and all five of its scientific instruments are working properly. The orbiter can reportedly continue orbiting Mars for several years with its remaining propellant.

A 17-day communications blackout occurred from 6 to 22 June 2015 while Mars' orbit took it behind the Sun from Earth's view.

On 24 September 2015, ISRO released its "Mars Atlas", a 120-page scientific atlas containing images and data from the Mars Orbiter Mission's first year in orbit.

In March 2016, the first science results of the mission were published in Geophysical Research Letters, presenting measurements obtained by the spacecraft's MENCA instrument of the Martian exosphere.

During 18 to 30 May 2016, a communication whiteout occurred with Earth coming directly between Sun and Mars. Due to high solar radiation, sending commands to spacecraft was avoided and payload operations were suspended.

On 17 January 2017, MOM's orbit was altered to avoid the impending eclipse season. With a burn of eight 22 N thrusters for 431 seconds, resulting in a velocity difference of  using  of propellant (leaving 13 kg remaining), eclipses were avoided until September 2017. The battery is able to handle eclipses of up to 100 minutes.

On 19 May 2017, MOM reached 1,000 days (973 sols) in orbit around Mars. In that time, the spacecraft completed 388 orbits of the planet and relayed more than 715 images back to Earth. ISRO officials stated that it remains in good health.

On 24 September 2018, MOM completed 4 years in its orbit around Mars, although the designed mission life was only six months. Over these years, MOM's Mars Colour Camera has captured over 980 images that were released to the public. The probe is still in good health and continues to work nominally.

On 24 September 2019, MOM completed 5 years in orbit around Mars, sending 2 terabytes of imaging data, and had enough propellant to complete another year in orbit.

On 1 July 2020, Mangalyaan was able to capture a photo of the Mars satellite Phobos from 4200 km away.

On 18 July 2021 Mars Colour Camera (MCC) captured full disc image of Mars from an altitude of about 75,000 km with spatial resolution about 3.7 km.

In October 2022, ISRO admitted that it has lost the communication with MOM in April 2022, when it faced increasingly longer duration eclipses, including a seven-hour long eclipse that it was not designed to withstand. ISRO said the spacecraft was likely out of propellant and not recoverable.

Recognition
In 2014, China referred to India's successful Mars Orbiter Mission as the "Pride of Asia". The Mars Orbiter Mission team won US-based National Space Society's 2015 Space Pioneer Award in the science and engineering category. NSS said the award was given as the Indian agency successfully executed a Mars mission in its first attempt; and the spacecraft is in an elliptical orbit with a high apoapsis where, with its high resolution camera, it is taking full-disk colour imagery of Mars. Very few full disk images have ever been taken in the past, mostly on approach to the planet, as most imaging is done looking straight down in mapping mode. These images will aid planetary scientists.

An illustration of the Mars Orbiter Mission spacecraft is featured on the reverse of the  currency note of India.

An image taken by the Mars Orbiter Mission spacecraft was the cover photo of the November 2016 issue of National Geographic magazine, for their story "Mars: Race to the Red Planet".

Follow-up mission
ISRO plans to develop and launch a follow-up mission called Mars Orbiter Mission 2 (MOM-2 or Mangalyaan-2) with a greater scientific payload to Mars in 2024 or 2026. The orbiter will use aerobraking to reduce apoapsis of its initial orbit and reach an altitude more suitable for scientific observation.

In popular culture
 The 2019 Hindi film Mission Mangal is loosely based on India's mission to Mars.
A web series called Mission Over Mars is loosely based on India's Mars mission.
 Space MOMs released online in 2019 is based India's Mars Mission.
 Mission Mars released in 2018 is a short Film based on India's Mars Mission.

See also
 
 
 List of ISRO missions
 List of Mars orbiters
 List of missions to Mars

References

External links

 Mars Orbiter Mission website 
 Mars Orbiter Mission brochure 
 Current Science Vol.109, Issue 6: Special Section on Mars Orbiter Mission with featured papers (25 September 2015)

ISRO space probes
Missions to Mars
Space probes launched in 2013
2013 in India
Satellites orbiting Mars
Geography of Mars
Spacecraft launched by PSLV rockets
Spacecraft decommissioned in 2022